Guillermo Pozos Guevara (born 7 July 1992 in Acapulco) is a Mexican professional footballer who plays as a goalkeeper.

Honours
León
 Liga MX: Guardianes 2020

External links
 

Living people
1992 births
Mexican footballers
Association football goalkeepers
Atlético Reynosa footballers
Club Celaya footballers
Irapuato F.C. footballers
Murciélagos FC footballers
Club León footballers
Liga MX players
Ascenso MX players
Liga Premier de México players
Tercera División de México players
Footballers from Guerrero
Sportspeople from Acapulco